Cylindera apiata is a species of ground beetle of the subfamily Cicindelinae. It is found in countries such as Argentina, Brazil, Paraguay, and Uruguay and is yellowish-black in colour.

References

apiata
Beetles described in 1825
Beetles of South America